Tash-Chishma (Taşşişmä) is a rural locality (a village) in Nizhnezaitovsky Selsoviet, Sharansky District, Bashkortostan, Russia. The population was 10 as of 2010. There is 1 street.

Geography 
Tash-Chishma is located 40 km northwest of Sharan (the district's administrative centre) by road. Kugarchi-Bulyak is the nearest rural locality.

References 

Rural localities in Sharansky District